Zoot Sims and the Gershwin Brothers is a 1975 studio album by Zoot Sims, featuring the music of George and Ira Gershwin.

Track listing
 "The Man I Love" – 6:26
 "How Long Has This Been Going On?" – 2:16
 "Oh, Lady be Good!" – 4:37
 "I've Got a Crush on You" – 3:01
 "I Got Rhythm" – 7:09
 "Embraceable You" – 4:52
 "'S Wonderful" – 4:40
 "Someone to Watch Over Me" – 3:46
 "Isn't It a Pity?" – 3:27
 "Summertime" (George Gershwin, Ira Gershwin, DuBose Heyward) – 5:25
 "They Can't Take That Away from Me" – 4:33

All music composed by George Gershwin and all lyrics written by Ira Gershwin except where noted.

Personnel

 Zoot Sims – saxophone
 Oscar Peterson – piano
 Joe Pass – guitar
 George Mraz – double bass
 Grady Tate – drums
Recorded June 6, 1975, New York City, New York

Technical personnel 
 Norman Granz – Producer
 Robert "Bob" Simpson - Recording Engineer

References

1975 albums
Zoot Sims albums
Pablo Records albums
Albums produced by Norman Granz